Oliver Campbell Bryson  (18 August 1896 – 27 March 1977) was a Royal Air Force officer who served in both World Wars. He was a flying ace credited with 12 aerial victories during the First World War.

Early life
Bryson was born in Lickey, a village in the Bromsgrove district of Worcestershire in England, the son of George and Edith Bryson. His father was a hardware merchant. In the 1911 Census of Uppingham in Rutland he is listed as a student at the Uppingham School.

First World War service
Bryson was educated at Bromsgrove School, and joined the Queen's Own Dorset Yeomanry in 1914. Shortly thereafter, he was wounded in action. While serving in Egypt, he transferred to the Royal Flying Corps. On 15 March 1917, after a flaming crash, he rescued his fellow aircrew member. In July 1917, he was posted to fly a SPAD for 19 Squadron in France. His first aerial victory followed shortly; he drove down a German observation plane down out of control on 25 August. By the end of the year, Bryson's victory total had increased to 11.

In January 1918, the King presented him with the Albert Medal for his heroism in rescuing his fellow airman following a crash at Wye Aerodrome. On 8 March, having upgraded to a Sopwith Dolphin fighter plane, Bryson scored his final victory of the war, destroying a German Albatros D.V over Gheluvelt, Belgium. His final summary showed he had destroyed four enemy aircraft; two of these were shared victories, including one with Arthur Bradfield Fairclough. Bryson's other eight wins were of the out of control variety; three of them were shared with such other aces as Albert Desbrisay Carter.

Interbellum and later career
Oliver Bryson was one of the British aviators ordered to Russia in 1919 to support the White Army in its counter-revolution against the Bolsheviks. He commanded a bomber squadron, and also flew operations in a Snipe. His gallantry earned him a Distinguished Flying Cross. Bryson was also granted a permanent commission as flight lieutenant, effective 1 August 1919.

Bryson was stationed in India from 1928 to 1931; he won a Bar to his Distinguished Flying Cross for his efforts.

In 1933, Bryson was assigned to the Central Flying School and put in charge of engines. He also was promoted to Squadron Leader.

On 1 November 1938, Bryson was promoted from wing commander to group captain.

Oliver Campbell Bryson retired from the Royal Air Force in 1943, having served for almost three decades.

Honours and awards
Award proclamation for the Albert Medal for lifesaving:

Citation accompanying award of the Military Cross:

Citation accompanying award of the Distinguished Flying Cross:

Bryson also won a Bar to the Distinguished Flying Cross. It was granted for his service on the North–West Frontier of India in 1930.

References
Notes

Bibliography
 

1896 births
1977 deaths
People educated at Bromsgrove School
Recipients of the Albert Medal (lifesaving)
Royal Flying Corps officers
British Army personnel of World War I
Recipients of the Military Cross
Queen's Own Dorset Yeomanry officers
Recipients of the Distinguished Flying Cross (United Kingdom)
British World War I flying aces
Royal Air Force personnel of the Russian Civil War
Military personnel from Worcestershire